Bally Glacier is a glacier  long which occupies the central part of the Carlstrom Foothills of the Churchill Mountains. It flows north along the east side of Mount Blick into Jorda Glacier. It was named by the Advisory Committee on Antarctic Names after John Bally of the University of Colorado Center for Astrophysics and Space Astronomy, Boulder, CO; he was a United States Antarctic Program principal investigator and field team member of the Advanced Telescope Project, South Pole Center for Astrophysical Research in Antarctica, 1992–95.

See also
 List of glaciers in the Antarctic
 Glaciology

References 

Glaciers of Oates Land